Seventeen Seconds is the second studio album by English rock band the Cure, released on 18 April 1980 by Fiction Records. The album marked the first time frontman Robert Smith co-produced with Mike Hedges. After the departure of original bassist Michael Dempsey, Simon Gallup became an official member along with keyboardist Matthieu Hartley. The single "A Forest" was the band's first entry in the top 40 of the UK Singles Chart.

History 
At the end of the Cure's 1979 UK tour supporting Siouxsie and the Banshees, Robert Smith spoke less and less with bassist Michael Dempsey. Early versions of "Play for Today" and "M" had been performed at a few concerts, but Dempsey did not like the new musical direction that Smith wanted to take. Smith commented: "I think the final straw came when I played Michael the demos for the next album and he hated them. He wanted us to be XTC part 2 and – if anything – I wanted us to be the Banshees part 2. So he left". Playing guitar with the Banshees for two months and learning their songs opened up another horizon to Smith. "It allowed me to think beyond what we were doing. I wanted to have a band that does what Steven Severin and Budgie do, where they just get a bassline and the drum part and Siouxsie wails". The records to which Smith was frequently listening during the composition of the album were Five Leaves Left by Nick Drake, Isle of Wight by Jimi Hendrix, Astral Weeks by Van Morrison and Low by David Bowie. Smith wrote the lyrics and music for most of the record at his parents' home, on a Hammond organ with a built-in tape recorder. Interviewed in 2004, producer Mike Hedges did not recall any demo tracks, with the band generally playing the track in the studio before laying down a backing track to which overdubs were added.

Two members of the Magazine Spies, bass guitarist Simon Gallup and keyboardist Matthieu Hartley, were added to the band's lineup. Gallup replaced Dempsey, which relieved Smith as he felt Dempsey's basslines were too ornate. Hartley's synth work added a new dimension to the band's newly ethereal sound, although he would later clash with Smith over complexity; Hartley enjoyed complex chords but Smith wanted single notes.

Money was short, so the album was recorded and mixed in seven days on a budget of between £2,000 and £3,000, which resulted in the band working 16 or 17 hours a day. Smith stated that as a result, the track "The Final Sound", which was planned to be much longer, was cut down to 53 seconds because the tape ran out while recording and band could not record it again. The album, mostly a collection of downbeat tracks, features ambient echoing vocals  with the sonic direction driven by its drum sound.

Musical style 
Retrospectively, Seventeen Seconds has been considered an early example of gothic rock. Its "gloomscapes" are considered to be "a sonic touchstone" for the forthcoming movement. The track "The Final Sound" is "so positively gothic you could almost be fooled into believing that it was lifted from the soundtrack of some Hammer horror gorefest". The album has also been described as new wave and post-punk.

Release and reissue 
Seventeen Seconds was released on 18 April 1980. It reached No. 20 on the British album charts. The record was repackaged in the US in 1981 (on the A&M label) with Faith as Happily Ever After, available as a double LP. In 2005, the album was remastered as part of Universal's Deluxe Edition series, featuring bonus live tracks and demos as well as studio material by Cult Hero, a 1970s-style progressive rock band along the lines of Easy Cure that featured Smith's postman Frank Bell as lead singer. Seventeen Seconds charted in the United States for the first time in September 2020, when it debuted at No. 186 on the Billboard 200 album chart.

Reception and legacy 

The album's songs have been described by critics as featuring vague, often unsettling lyrics and dark, spare, minimalistic melodies. Some reviewers, such as Nick Kent of NME, felt that Seventeen Seconds represented a far more mature Cure, who had come very far musically in less than one year. Ian Cranna of Smash Hits wrote that the band were creating more ambitious music, while still retaining their "powerful melodic intensity". Chris Westwood of Record Mirror was less enthusiastic, viewing the album as "a sidewards step" rather than a progression; he found the material "biteless, a bit distant", showcasing a "reclusive, disturbed Cure, sitting in cold, dark, empty rooms, watching clocks".

Simon Reynolds said the album was "translucent-sounding", with shades of the Durutti Column, Young Marble Giants and Another Green World by Brian Eno. AllMusic writer Chris True said that while Seventeen Seconds had come to be largely overlooked in later years apart from its single "A Forest", it nonetheless represented an important development for the Cure, capturing them becoming "more rigid in sound, and more disciplined in attitude", and anticipating the bleak lyrical themes that would become more apparent on subsequent Cure albums.

Seventeen Seconds was included in the book 1001 Albums You Must Hear Before You Die. The authors note: "Like the album's cover art, which is little more than an abstract blur, the bleak, minimalist sound of Seventeen Seconds-era Cure is subtly suggestive." Attention is drawn to the "beguiling bleakness, both in its brief instrumentals and the more pop-oriented tracks (such as the sharp, hook-laden 'Play for Today') that hark back to their earlier work." In 2020, Rolling Stone included Seventeen Seconds in their "80 Greatest albums of 1980" list.

Track listing 

Note
The US and UK cassette versions feature different cover art, with some tree branches at left and a reddish blob at the bottom, and have an alternate track order, with "A Forest" appearing as track 2 on Side A, switching places with "Play For Today" appearing as track 2 on Side B:

Personnel 
The Cure

 Robert Smith – guitars, vocals, production
 Matthieu Hartley – keyboards, production assistance
 Lol Tolhurst – drums, production assistance
 Simon Gallup – bass guitar, production assistance
Production
 Mike Hedges – production, engineering
 Chris Parry – production assistance
 Mike Dutton - engineering 
 Nigel Green – engineering assistance
 Andrew Warwick – engineering assistance
 Andrew Douglas – photography
 Bill Smith and the Cure – cover art

Charts

Weekly charts

Year-end charts

Certifications and sales

References

External links 
 Seventeen Seconds (Adobe Flash) at Radio3Net (streamed copy where licensed)
 

The Cure albums
Fiction Records albums
1980 albums
Albums produced by Mike Hedges
Elektra Records albums
Rhino Records albums
Albums recorded at Morgan Sound Studios